Blaydon RFC is an English semi-professional rugby union team. The first team currently play in the fourth tier of the English rugby union system (National League 2 North), having been promoted as champions from North Premier at the end of the 2019–20 season. Their home ground is at Crow Trees, Swalwell, Tyne and Wear.

First team
The Blaydon first team are presently the joint third highest placed league team in the North East (behind Premiership side, Newcastle Falcons, National League 1 club Darlington Mowden Park R.F.C. and alongside National League 2 North Tynedale RFC). Due to Blaydon's close proximity to the Falcons, many of the Falcon's academy players are given playing experience at Blaydon.

Current standings

Youth rugby
Blaydon run various youth teams, ranging from under-7 to under-19.

Best results
 Under-19 (2008): National semi-final [v Harrogate, 16 March, Crow Trees]
 Under-17 (2009–10): National Plate semi-final [v Sheffield, 23 March, Crow Trees]
 Under-17 (2013–14):  National Shield winners (v Dartfordians, 4 May, AJ Bell Stadium)

Honours
 Durham Senior Cup winners (5): 1996, 2004, 2006, 2010, 2013
North East 1 champions: 1994–95
 North 1 v Midlands 1 promotion play-off winner: 2000–01
 National League 3 North champions: 2006–07
 North Premier champions: 2019−20

International players
  Mark Wilson (rugby union)
  Michael Skinner (rugby union)
  Steve Bainbridge
  Trevor Davison (rugby union)
  Selwyn St. Bernard
  Matthew Cook

Notable former players
  Andrew Baggett – fly-half who became the all-time National League 1 points scorer with over 1,700 points, the majority whilst playing for Blaydon.  He also represented Yorkshire and Durham and was part of the Yorkshire side that won the 2008 Bill Beamont Cup.

References

1888 establishments in England
English rugby union teams
Rugby clubs established in 1888
Sport in Tyne and Wear